James W. Byrd (born March 14, 1954) is an American politician and former Democratic member of the Wyoming House of Representatives, representing the 44th district from 2009 to 2019.  His mother, Harriet Elizabeth Byrd previously held the same seat from 1980 to 1988, and was the first African-American to serve in the Wyoming State Legislature.  Byrd retired from his House of Representatives seat to run for Wyoming Secretary of State shortly after Republican incumbent Ed Murray resigned, but lost the November 2018 election to Murray's successor Edward Buchanan.

References

External links
Wyoming State Legislature - Representative James W. Byrd official WY House website
Project Vote Smart - Representative James W. Byrd (WY) profile
Follow the Money - James W. Byrd
2008 campaign contributions

1954 births
21st-century American politicians
African-American state legislators in Wyoming
Living people
Democratic Party members of the Wyoming House of Representatives
Politicians from Cheyenne, Wyoming
21st-century African-American politicians
20th-century African-American people